Scleria foliosa is a plant in the family Cyperaceae. It grows as an annual or perennial.

Distribution and habitat
Scleria foliosa grows widely in Africa and is also found in Madagascar. One instance has been reported from India's Karnataka state. Its habitat is seasonal wet areas and shaded areas near water.

References

foliosa
Flora of West Tropical Africa
Flora of Ethiopia
Flora of East Tropical Africa
Flora of Burundi
Flora of Angola
Flora of Zimbabwe
Flora of Southern Africa
Flora of Madagascar
Flora of Karnataka
Plants described in 1850